The following is a partial list of strawberry cultivars. Strawberries come in a wide assortment of commercially available cultivars (cultivated varieties). Differences between cultivars may include the date the fruit ripens, disease resistance, freezing quality, firmness, berry size, berry shape, and flavor. Many different cultivars have been developed at the University of California (Davis campus), by Driscoll Strawberry Associates Inc. (Watsonville, California), the United States Department of Agriculture, Agriculture and Agri-Food Canada and East Malling Research Station in the UK.

Almost all the strawberries listed below are cultivars of Fragaria × ananassa. Two cultivars listed here ('Frel' (Pink Panda) and 'Samba' (Red Ruby)) are bigeneric hybrids, grown mainly for their flower colour rather than their fruit, using a closely related species (Potentilla palustris = Comarum palustre) to introduce pink or red colouration to the flowers.

The cultivar Fragaria × ananassa 'Variegata' is grown mainly for the decorative qualities of its variegated foliage.

Table

This table includes a list of strawberry cultivars that are commercially available.

Cultivar names should be shown in single quotes. Names shown in Small Capitals are trade designations, or "selling names", used in certain countries (with the cultivar name shown alongside); the same cultivar may be sold under a different trade designation in other countries.

References

 
Garden Strawberry
Lists of cultivars
Lists of foods
Gardening lists